Football Club Progrès Niederkorn is a football club based in Niederkorn, in south-western Luxembourg.

History
During the German occupation of Luxembourg, the club played in the Gauliga Moselland under the name of FK Niederkorn, where it finished runners-up in 1942–43, behind champions TuS Neuendorf.

Three times domestic league winners, the club's most successful years were at the end of the 1970s and beginning of the 1980s. They have not won any major silverware since the 1981 league title.

In the 2005–06 season, Niederkorn finished second in Luxembourg's second division, the Division of Honour. As the top league, the National Division, expanded from twelve teams to fourteen, Niederkorn were promoted along with Differdange 03.

In the 2016–17 Luxembourg National Division, Progrès Niederkorn drew the league's highest attendance that year: 1,820. Their average home attendance was 710.

On 4 July 2017, Progrès beat Scottish side Rangers in the 1st qualifying round of the 2017–18 UEFA Europa League. They overcame a 1–0 defeat at Ibrox with a 2–0 win at the Stade Josy Barthel, having scored only once before in European competition. This victory was also the club's first ever win in European football. They enjoyed an even greater campaign in the 2018–19 UEFA Europa League, defeating FK Gabala and Budapest Honvéd FC to reach the third qualifying round against Russian side FC Ufa. The tie seemed destined for extra-time but a last-minute goal for Ufa sent Progres out, denying them a rematch against Rangers in the play-offs.

Honours

National Division
Winners (3): 1952–53, 1977–78, 1980–81
Runners-up (6): 1931–32, 1936–37, 1976–77, 1978–79, 1981–82, 2017–18

Luxembourg Cup
Winners (4): 1932–33, 1944–45, 1976–77, 1977–78
Runners-up (3): 1945–46, 1955–56, 1979–80

European competition
Their first European goal was against Glentoran in the 1981–82 European Cup, where they drew 1–1.

Record by competition
As of match played 26 August 2020

Matches

Current squad

Out on loan

Women's team
The women's team plays in Luxembourg's highest league, the Dames Ligue 1. The team has won 15 championships and are therefore the national record champions. The last title was won in 2010–11, which qualified them for the 2011–12 UEFA Women's Champions League.

References

External links
 Official website – Progres Niederkorn

Football clubs in Luxembourg
Sports teams in Differdange
Association football clubs established in 1919
Football clubs from former German territories
1919 establishments in Luxembourg
Women's football clubs in Luxembourg